English singer and songwriter La Roux has released three studio albums, one mix album, one mixtape, two extended plays, nine singles (including one as a featured artist), two promotional singles and nine music videos. La Roux was originally formed as a duo in 2006, consisting of Elly Jackson and Ben Langmaid. They first collaborated on the acoustic project Automan before opting to switch to a musical style similar to that of Prince, David Bowie and The Knife, naming their new project La Roux.

The duo's eponymous debut studio album was released in June 2009, reaching number two on the UK Albums Chart and number seven on the Irish Albums Chart. The album was eventually certified platinum by the British Phonographic Industry (BPI) and the Irish Recorded Music Association (IRMA). In 2011, La Roux won a Grammy Award for Best Electronic/Dance Album. Four singles were released from the album: "Quicksand", "In for the Kill", "Bulletproof" and "I'm Not Your Toy". "Bulletproof" peaked at number one on the UK Singles Chart and was certified gold by the BPI. Following Langmaid's departure from La Roux, Jackson released La Roux's second studio album, Trouble in Paradise, in July 2014.

Albums

Studio albums

Mix albums

Mixtapes

Extended plays

Singles

As lead artist

As featured artist

Promotional singles

Guest appearances

Other credits

Music videos

Notes

References

External links
 
 
 
 

Discographies of British artists
Electronic music discographies
Pop music group discographies